Sai Wan Ho is one of 35 constituencies in the Eastern District of Hong Kong.

The constituency elects one district councillor to the Eastern District Council every four years. It was created in the first District Board election in 1982 and was last held by Mak Tak-ching of the Labour Party.

Sai Wan Ho constituency is loosely based on the central area of Sai Wan Ho, with an estimated population of 20,013.

Councillors represented

Election results

2010s

2000s

1990s

1980s

Notes

References

Sai Wan Ho
Constituencies of Hong Kong
Constituencies of Eastern District Council
1982 establishments in Hong Kong
Constituencies established in 1982